National Tertiary Route 749, or just Route 749 (or ) is a National Road Route of Costa Rica, located in the Alajuela province.

Description
In Alajuela province the route covers San Carlos canton (Aguas Zarcas district).

References

Highways in Costa Rica